Pennsylvania held statewide elections on November 7, 2017 to fill judicial positions on the Supreme Court, Superior Court, Commonwealth Court, allow judicial retention votes, and fill numerous county, local and municipal offices. The necessary primary elections were held in May 2017.

Special Elections

Pennsylvania House of Representatives

133rd legislative district 
A special election for the 133rd legislative district took place on December 5 after the death of Democratic State Representative Daniel McNeill.

Democrats selected McNeill's wife Jeanne McNeill as their nominee. Republicans nominated David Molony, and Libertarians nominated Samantha Dorney.

197th legislative district 
Democratic State Representative Leslie Acosta was re-elected during the 2016 elections, but later resigned after pleading guilty to charges of embezzlement. A special election for the 197th legislative district took place on March 21.

Republicans nominated Lucinda Little for the seat. Democrats originally nominated health clinic administrator Frederick Ramirez, but a Commonwealth Court ruling declared Ramirez did not reside in the district and removed him from the ballot. Democrats attempted to replace Ramirez with Philadelphia Parking Authority auditor Emilio Vazquez, but the Court ruled (and the Supreme Court of Pennsylvania confirmed) that the filing deadline had passed, preventing the substitution. Vazquez subsequently ran a write-in campaign, along with Green Party candidate Cheri Honkala.

After the special election, four elections officers would be charged with interference after allegations of duress and voter intimidation were alleged.

Justice of the Supreme Court
One vacancy occurred after Justice J. Michael Eakin left the court in 2016.

Primary 
Republican Superior Court judge Sallie Updyke Mundy was appointed by Governor Tom Wolf to the seat vacated by Justice Eakin and confirmed on June 27, 2016. She ran for a full 10-year term in 2017 and was unopposed in the Republican primary.

Allegheny County Court of Common Pleas judge and former Pittsburgh Steelers cornerback Dwayne Woodruff ran unopposed in the Democratic primary.

General election

Judge of the Superior Court
4 vacancies

Primary election

General election

Judge of the Commonwealth Court
2 vacancies

Primary election

General election

Judicial Retention

Justice of the Supreme Court

Judge of the Superior Court

Mayoral Elections

Pittsburgh

Lancaster

Allentown

Harrisburg

Ballot Questions

References

November 2017 events in the United States
2017
2017 Pennsylvania elections
Pennsylvania special elections
Pennsylvania